= Electronic data =

Electronic data can stand for

- data in general that is exchanged via electronic communication lines
- digital data in particular
- Data (computing), i.e. computer-processable data as opposed to executable code
